Pilkhana is a neighbourhood in Howrah, West Bengal, India. It was the slum about which Dominique Lapierre's bestselling book City of Joy was written. Pilkhana has at least tens of thousands of residents. It is near to Howrah Station. A Haliman High School exists here. The area has significant Hindu and Muslim populations. Pilkhana is of industrial character. It is a part of Howrah Uttar (Vidhan Sabha constituency). The Salesians of Don Bosco are present in Pilkhana.

Pilkhana is governed by Golabari Police Station under Howrah City Police.  It is a part of the area covered by Kolkata Metropolitan Development Authority (KMDA).

Location
Pilkhana is located on the west bank of Hooghly River. Howrah Maidan is on its south, Salkia is on its north and Tikiapara is on its west.

Transport
State Highway 6 (West Bengal)/Grand Trunk Road passes through the west side of Pilkhana. Maulana Abul Kalam Azad Road and Acharya Tulsi Marg (Salkia School Road) run along the middle and eastern part of Pilkhana respectively. All these three roads are connected with Dr. Abani Dutta Road.

Pilkhana is connected to Howrah Maidan and South Howrah with a Rail Overbridge, Chandmari Bridge, commonly known as Bangal Babur Bridge. This bridge was opened in 1933 by East Indian Railway Company (EIR) and was named after Bangal Babu (Zamindar Ramjatan Bose).

Bus

Private Bus
 C Howrah Fire Station - Park Street
 24 Bandhaghat – Topsia
 24A Bandhaghat – Topsia
 24A/1 Howrah Fire Station - Mukundapur
 51 Pardankuni - Howrah Station
 54 Bally Khal – Esplanade
 56 Ruiya Purbapara - Howrah Station
 57A Chanditala - Howrah Station

Mini Bus
 1 Bandhaghat – Esplanade
 1A Satyabala – Ruby Hospital
 2 Salkia – Esplanade
 10 Bally Khal – Khidirpur
 11 Belur Math – Esplanade
 18 Kona – Esplanade
 25 Malipanchghara – Sealdah/Rajabazar
 30 Baluhati – Esplanade
 39 Bhattanagar – Esplanade

WBTC Bus
 C24 Ghasbagan - Rajabazar
 S32A Belgharia (Rathtala) - Howrah Station

Bus Routes Without Numbers
 Bandar (Dhanyaghori) - Howrah Station

Train
Howrah Station is the nearest railway station.

Ferry
Pilkhana has a nearby ferry ghat named Golabari Ghat on the banks of Hooghly River with regular ferry services at 10 min interval.

References

Slums of West Bengal
Neighbourhoods in Howrah
Neighbourhoods in Kolkata
Kolkata Metropolitan Area
Cities and towns in Howrah district